The discography of American musician Thundercat includes four studio albums, an extended play, and twelve singles (including three as a featured artist).

Albums

Extended plays

Singles

As lead artist

As featured artist

Guest appearances

Production discography

2011
Thundercat – The Golden Age of Apocalypse
 02. "Daylight" (produced with Taylor Graves and Flying Lotus)
 03. "Fleer Ultra" (produced with Taylor Graves) 
 04. "Is It Love?" (produced with Flying Lotus)
 05. "For Love I Come" (produced with Flying Lotus)
 06. "It Really Doesn't Matter to You" (produced with Hadrien Féraud and Flying Lotus)
 07. "Jamboree" (produced with Ronald Bruner Jr., Brook D’Leau, and Flying Lotus)
 08. "Boat Cruise" (produced with Shafiq Husayn and Flying Lotus)
 09. "Seasons" (produced with Shafiq Husayn)
 10. "Goldenboy" (produced with Chris Dave)
 11. "Walkin" (produced with Hadrien Féraud and Flying Lotus)
 12. "Mystery Machine (The Golden Age Of Apocalypse)" (produced with Flying Lotus)
 13. "Return to the Journey" (produced with Flying Lotus)

2012
JoJo – Agápē
 01. "Back2thebeginningagain" (produced with State of Emergency)

2013
The Internet – Feel Good
 06. "Red Balloon"

Childish Gambino – Because the Internet
 06. "II. Shadows" (produced with Childish Gambino and Ludwig Göransson)

Mac Miller – Live from Space
 14. "In the Morning" (produced with The Internet)

2014
Mac Miller - Faces
 01. "Inside Outside"
 15. "55" (produced with Mac Miller)

Issa Gold - Conversations with a Butterfly
 07. "Lions Can Fly"

SZA

 "Sobriety" (produced with Chris Calor, Cody, LoveDragon, Sounwave and Ifan Dafydd)

2015
Kendrick Lamar - To Pimp a Butterfly
 01. "Wesley's Theory" (produced with Flying Lotus, Flippa, and Sounwave)
 10. "Hood Politics" (produced with Tae Beast and Sounwave)
 12. "Complexion (A Zulu Love)" (produced with Sounwave, Terrace Martin, and The Antydote)

Thundercat - The Beyond / Where the Giants Roam
 01. "Hard Times"
 02. "Song for the Dead" (produced with Mono/Poly)
 03. "Them Changes" (produced with Flying Lotus)
 04. "Lone Wolf and Cub" (produced with Mono/Poly and Flying Lotus)
 05. "That Moment" (produced with Flying Lotus)
 06. "Where the Giants Roam/Field of the Nephilim"

Kirk Knight - Late Knight Special
 10. "Dead Friends" (produced with Kirk Knight)

2016
Kendrick Lamar - Untitled Unmastered
 02. "Untitled 02 | 06.23.2014." (produced with Cardo and Yung Exclusive)
 04. "Untitled 04 | 08.14.2014." (produced with Sounwave and Kendrick Lamar)
 08. "Untitled 08 | 09.06.2014." (produced with Mono/Poly)

2017
Thundercat - Drunk
 01. "Rabbot Ho" (produced with Flying Lotus)
 02. "Captain Stupido" (produced with Flying Lotus)
 03. "Uh Uh" (produced with Flying Lotus)
 04. "Bus in These Streets" (produced with Flying Lotus)
 07. "Jethro" (produced with Flying Lotus)
 08. "Day & Night" (produced with Flying Lotus)
 09. "Show You the Way" (produced with Flying Lotus)
 10. "Walk on By" (produced with Flying Lotus)
 12. "Tokyo"
 13. "Jameel's Space Ride" (produced with Flying Lotus)
 15. "Them Changes" (produced with Flying Lotus)
 16. "Where I'm Going" (produced with Flying Lotus)
 17. "Drink Dat"
 18. "Inferno" (produced with Flying Lotus)
 19. "I Am Crazy" (produced with Flying Lotus)
 20. "3AM" (produced with Flying Lotus)
 21. "Drunk" (produced with Flying Lotus)
 22. "The Turn Down" (produced with Flying Lotus)
 23. "DUI" (produced with Flying Lotus)
 24. "Hi"

2018
Kali Uchis - Isolation
 01. "Body Language" (produced with Om'Mas Keith)

Travis Scott - Astroworld
 11. "Astrothunder" (produced with Travis Scott, Frank Dukes, John Mayer, BadBadNotGood, River Tiber, and Vegyn)

Joji - Ballads 1
 05. "Can't Get Over You" (produced with Clams Casino and Rogét Chahayed)

2019
Danny Brown - U Know What I'm Sayin?
 09. "Negro Spiritual" (produced with Flying Lotus)
Buddy - Harlan & Alondra (Deluxe)
 15. "Link Up" (produced with Flying Lotus)

2021
H.E.R. - Back of My Mind
 06. "Bloody Waters" (produced with Kaytranada and Jeff "Gitty" Gitelman)

2022
Denzel Curry - Melt My Eyez See Your Future
 11. "The Smell of Death"
Kendrick Lamar - Mr. Morale & the Big Steppers
 Die Hard
 Mother I Sober
JID - The Forever Story
 Lauder Too

Other appearances

References

Discographies of American artists